Yevgeny Yakovlevich Vesnik (15 January 1923 in Petrograd – 10 April 2009 in Moscow) was a Soviet and Russian actor. The son of Yakov Vesnik, the first director of the Kryvorizhstal plant, he fought the Germans in World War II. He worked at the Maly Theatre from 1963 and was named a People's Artist of the USSR in 1989, three years before his retirement from the stage.

Career
Primarily a comedian, Vesnik is remembered as the first Soviet actor to play the character of Ostap Bender. After he was remembered as Taratar in The Adventures of the Elektronic (1979), one of greatest Soviet films for children'.

Among his other roles are the policeman in Old Khottabych, boss of sport complex  in Seven Old Men and a Girl,   procurator in Die Fledermaus,  commissioner in Charodei (1982),  radist  in Weather Is Good on Deribasovskaya, It Rains Again on Brighton Beach and many other films.

He died, aged 86, on 10 April 2009 in Moscow after suffering a stroke.

Honors and awards
Order "For Merit to the Fatherland", 4th class
Order of the Red Banner of Labour
Order of Friendship of Peoples
Order of the Patriotic War 2nd class
Order of the Red Star
Medal "For the Victory over Germany in the Great Patriotic War 1941–1945"
Two Medals "For Courage"
Medal "For the Capture of Königsberg"
Medal "Veteran of Labour"
Medal "In Commemoration of the 800th Anniversary of Moscow"
Jubilee Medal "50 Years of the Armed Forces of the USSR"
 Medal "In Commemoration of the 850th Anniversary of Moscow"
Medal of Zhukov
Honored Artist of the RSFSR (1961)
People's Artist of the RSFSR (1971)
People's Artist of the USSR (1989)

Selected filmography

 Othello (1955) as Roderigo
 Old Khottabych (1957) as guard policeman
 The Adventures of Buratino (1959) as Father Carlo (voice)
 An Ordinary Miracle (1965) as hunter
 Strong with Spirit (1967) as Voronchuk
 I Loved You (1968) as Pavel Golikov 
 Trembita (1968) as Bogdan Susik
 The New Adventures of the Elusive Avengers (1968) as Polpovnik
 Ded Moroz and Summer (1969, Short) as truck driver / policeman / doctor (voice)
 Seven Old Men and a Girl (1970, TV Movie) as sports complex director
  Adventures of the Yellow Suitcase (1970) as Airport manager
 Officers (1971) as paramedic
 We Didn't Learn This (1976) as Ivan Andreevich, glavniy arkhitektor
 Die Fledermaus (1979, TV Movie) as Prosecutor
 The Adventures of the Elektronic (1979, TV Mini-Series) as Math Teacher 'Tarator'
 The Theme (1979) as Igor Paschin, writer
 The Fairfax Millions (1980) as Police Commissioner
 Dog in Boots (1981, Short) as Cardinal's Cat (voice)
 Sorcerers (1982, TV Movie) as chairman of the commission
 Act, Manya! (1991) as biologist and geneticist Yevgeni Danilovitch
 Weather Is Good on Deribasovskaya, It Rains Again on Brighton Beach (1992) as Monya, ex-radist
 What a Mess! (1995) as doctor
 The Master and Margarita (2006) as professor Stravinskiy (final film role)

References

External links

1923 births
2009 deaths
Male actors from Saint Petersburg
Soviet male actors
Honored Artists of the RSFSR
People's Artists of the RSFSR
People's Artists of the USSR
Recipients of the Medal "For Courage" (Russia)
Recipients of the Medal of Zhukov
Recipients of the Order of Friendship of Peoples
Recipients of the Order of the Red Banner of Labour
Recipients of the Order of the Red Star
Recipients of the Order "For Merit to the Fatherland", 4th class
Russian people of Belarusian descent
Russian people of Czech descent
Burials in Troyekurovskoye Cemetery